Jean Colombera (born 2 February 1954 in Esch-sur-Alzette) is a politician and physician in Luxembourg.  He currently sits as a member of the Chamber of Deputies for the Alternative Democratic Reform Party, representing the Nord constituency.

Born in Esch-sur-Alzette, Colombera is an Italian Luxembourger.  He was formerly an Italian citizen, but gained Luxembourgian citizenship in 1999.  Originally a Green, after gaining citizenship (a condition for being a deputy), Colombera asked Jean-Pierre Koepp if the ADR had a spare slot on their list in Nord, in which his hometown of Vichten is located.

In the 1999 election, Colombera was elected, narrowly finished second (behind Koepp) on the ADR's list, with two being elected.  Colombera lost his seat in 2004, as the ADR lost its second seat in Nord and Colombera once again came second, again behind Koepp.  He regained his seat in the 2009 election, after Koepp retired, allowing Colombera to re-enter the Chamber despite the ADR falling to fifth place in the constituency.

Colombera is a campaigner in favour of legalising medical cannabis.  He is head of the Francophone Union for Cannabinoids in Medicine.  He is under investigation for prescribing cannabinoids to his patients, under Luxembourg's Narcotics Act.

Footnotes

External links
  Chamber of Deputies official biography

Members of the Chamber of Deputies (Luxembourg)
Members of the Chamber of Deputies (Luxembourg) from Nord
Alternative Democratic Reform Party politicians
Luxembourgian people of Italian descent
Italian people of Luxembourgian descent
1954 births
Living people
People from Esch-sur-Alzette